Aluf ( or "First\leader of a group" in Biblical Hebrew) is a senior military rank in the Israel Defence Forces (IDF) for officers who in other countries would have the rank of general, air marshal, or admiral. In addition to the aluf rank,  four other ranks are derivatives of the word, together, constituting the five highest ranks in the IDF.

Aside from being a military rank, "Aluf" is also used in a civilian context, particularly in sports, meaning "champion".

Etymology 

The term aluf comes from the Bible ( ’allūp̄): the Edomites used it as a rank of nobility, while the later books of the Tanakh use it to describe Israelite captains as well, e.g. Zachariah 9:7, 12:5-6, and later, for example Psalms 55:13, where it is used as a general term for teacher. It comes from a Semitic root meaning "thousand", making an ’allūp̄ the one who commands a thousand people. Strong however connects the word used to describe the Dukes of Edom, to a different root "alf" denoting a teacher and the root for the animal 'ox' from which the letter Aleph itself is derived, rather than eleph thousand, however they both comprise the same 3 letters.

Rank order of aluf and its derivatives

The Israel Defense Forces (IDF) form an integrated force; ranks are the same in all services.

 
 
 
 
 

 is usually translated as "lieutenant general", although it is the most senior rank in the IDF. The rank is given only to the Chief of General Staff, so there can only be one active  under normal circumstances. However this can change in a time of war. During the Yom Kippur War in 1973, retired  Haim Bar-Lev was recalled into service, replacing Shmuel Gonen as the commander of the southern theater. Thus, along with chief of the general staff David Elazar (who had succeeded Bar-Lev in that position the previous year), there were two s in active service.

Israel is essentially a land and air power, with the navy receiving less than five percent of the military budget.

The non-Hebrew word "general" was also adopted into Hebrew, and is used to refer to the generals of foreign armies. It can also be used colloquially in reference to a senior Israeli officer, in a derogatory sense implying that the officer in question is over-officious, incompetent, or involved in internecine power struggles with other officers, sometimes referred to as the "war of the generals", to the neglect of proper military duties. For example, former Israeli Labor Party chairman Amir Peretz, criticized in a speech two other party members who both held the rank of (retired) aluf: former Vice-Chief of General Staff,  Matan Vilnai and former Commander of the Israeli Navy,  Ami Ayalon, referring to them (and other former senior officers of the IDF) as "the generals and admirals":

See also
 Israel Defense Forces ranks
 Mickey Marcus - the IDF's first aluf.
 Yaakov Dori - the IDF's first rav aluf (Chief of Staff)

References

Military ranks of Israel